Autoroute 73 may refer to:
 A73 autoroute, in France 
 Quebec Autoroute 73, in Quebec, Canada

See also 
 A73 roads
 List of highways numbered 73